Michael Reiterer (Innsbruck, 29 September 1954), member of the European External Action Service (EEAS) EU diplomatic service, serves since February 2017 as the Ambassador of the European Union to the Republic of Korea.

Academic career 
Michael Reiterer studied law at the University of Innsbruck from where graduated in 1978 as doctor juris (Dr. jur.). Subsequently he obtained post graduate diplomas in international relations from the Johns Hopkins University, School of Advanced International Studies, Bologna Center (1979) and the Graduate Institute of International Studies (HEI) in Geneva (1985). In 2005 he was appointed adjunct professor (‘Dozent’) for international politics at the University of Innsbruck, Austria; time permitting he teaches at various international universities and publishes on EU-foreign policy, EU-Asia relations with particular focus on Northeast Asia, inter-regionalism, ASEM, human rights and cultural diplomacy cf.list of publications He is a frequent speaker at international conferences and interacts with think tanks. Memberships include Corresponding member of the Program Committee of the European Forum Alpbach, Consultative Council of the Vienna Institute for Economic Studies; Academic Consultative Council of the University of Kobe.

Austrian diplomatic service 
Michael Reiterer held positions at the Missions of Austria to the European Union (1997–1998) and the GATT (1990–1992) and negotiated in the GATT Uruguay Round. He was co-chair trade of the OECD Joint Experts Group of trade and environment experts. He served on the GATT Panel Split-run editions Canada-US. He was also Deputy Austrian Trade Commissioner to West Africa with seat in Abidjan/Côte d'Ivoire (1982–1985) and Japan (1985–1988); 1992–1997 he served as Deputy Director General for European Integration Policy of the Federal Economic Chamber of Austria; 1997/1998 he was a member of the European Social and Economic Committee.

EU diplomatic service 
Having joint the European foreign service in 1998 as Counselor for ASEM (1998–2002), he served as Minister/Deputy Head of the EC Delegation to Japan (2002–2006), EU-Ambassador to Switzerland and the Principality of Liechtenstein (2007–2011) and Principal Adviser to the Managing Director for the Asia Pacific of the European External Action Service (2012–2016). Since February 2017 he serves as Ambassador of the European Union to the Republic of Korea.

Bibliography

External links 

 List of publications

1954 births
Living people
Graduate Institute of International and Development Studies alumni
Austrian diplomats
Ambassadors of the European Union to Liechtenstein
Ambassadors of the European Union to South Korea
Ambassadors of the European Union to Switzerland
Austrian officials of the European Union
University of Innsbruck alumni